The Eckert number (Ec) is a dimensionless number used in continuum mechanics. It expresses the relationship between a flow's kinetic energy and the boundary layer enthalpy difference, and is used to characterize heat transfer  dissipation. It is named after Ernst R. G. Eckert.

It is defined as

where
 u is the local flow velocity of the continuum,
 cp is the constant-pressure local specific heat of the continuum,
  is the difference between wall temperature and local temperature.

References

Dimensionless numbers of fluid mechanics
Dimensionless numbers of thermodynamics
Continuum mechanics